The VB Wave is a trolley-inspired, bus rapid transit line in Virginia Beach, Virginia. The system contains three of the Hampton Roads Transit bus lines that link the beach to other attractions in inner Virginia Beach. Unique to other bus lines in the region, the Wave has its own right-of-way, off-bus fare collection, streetcar-inspired design and more frequent services.

Services 
 Route 30: Atlantic Avenue Shuttle (or Red Line)
 Route 31: Aquarium and Campground Shuttle  (or Brown Line)
 Route 35: Shore Drive Shuttle  (or Orange Line)

See also 
 GRTC Pulse, a bus rapid transit system in Richmond, Virginia
 Metroway, a bus rapid transit system in Arlington and Alexandria, Virginia

References

External links 
 Map of Route
 Transit Page

Hampton Roads Transit
Transportation in Virginia Beach, Virginia
Bus rapid transit in Virginia